Ervis Kaja (born 29 July 1987) is an Albanian professional footballer who plays as a centre-back.

Club career
On 30 August 2013, Tirana announced the signing of Kaja on a one-year contract. He commenced the season on 1 September by starting the team first match of league, a goalless home draw against Laçi. Tirana struggled for results in the first part of the season, ending it in the last place only 10 points from 13 matches, 7 points away from the safe zone. Kaja lost his place in the starting lineup in the second part of the season as Tirana witnessed alteration, securing another season in top flight after a 2–2 draw versus Flamurtari Vlorë on 3 May 2014. He left the club following the end of the season, making 15 appearances, including 13 in league.

On 7 August 2014, Kaja returned to Laçi after a three-year absence by signing for an undisclosed fee. However, he left the club after only 19 days by terminating his contract for unknown reasons, becoming a free agent in the process.

On 1 September 2014, Kaja completed a transfer to Apolonia Fier by signing a three-year contract. In January 2015, it was rumoured that Kaja was about to leave the club but it was the player himself who denied all the rumours. He explained the situation by saying that he didn't train with the team in the last days due to some school obligations in Tiranë.

On 27 July 2016, Kaja joined newly promoted Albanian Superliga side Korabi Peshkopi, signing for an undisclosed fee along with eight other players. He was a regular starter during the 2016–17 season, making 30 league appearances as Korabi finished last in the championship, returning in First Division after one season. He left the team following the end of the season.

On 29 August 2017, Kaja remained on top flight by joining Lushnja. However, he left the club only 11 days later by terminating his contract, stating that he main reason were financial terms.

On 11 September 2017, Kaja joined his first club Besa Kavajë as a free agent. The transfer was made official three days later, with the player signing a one-year contract. He made his first appearance in the opening matchday of 2017–18 Albanian First Division against Dinamo Tirana, helping the team to keep a clean sheet. On 28 October, he received a red card in the 1–5 home defeat to Egnatia. Five days later, he was banned for 2 league matches by Disciplinary Committee of AFA for dangerous play. Kaja left the club in December 2017 due to club's financial and organizational issues. Besa finished the first part of the season far away from their initial goal.

In January 2018, Kaja left Albania and joined Football Superleague of Kosovo outfit Liria Prizren for the remainder of the 2017–18 season.

On 19 August 2018, Kaja joined Drita for the 2018–19 campaign. However, after 11 appearances and one goal, scored on his debut against Flamurtari Pristina on 26 August, Kaja terminated his contract with the club by mutual consent with the aim of returning to Albania.

At the end of August 2019, Kaja moved to Germany and joined ATSV Erlangen under charge of Kosovan manager Shqipran Skeraj. On 2 February 2020 it was confirmed, that his contract had been terminated after 10 games.

Style of play
Apart from playing as a centre-back, Kaja can also play as a central midfielder.

Career statistics

Honours
Besa Kavajë

Albanian Cup: 2006–07

References

External links
 
 
 

1987 births
Living people
People from Përmet
Albanian footballers
Albanian expatriate footballers
Association football defenders
Besa Kavajë players
KF Laçi players
FK Tomori Berat players
FK Dinamo Tirana players
KF Tirana players
KF Apolonia Fier players
KF Korabi Peshkopi players
KF Liria players
FC Drita players
Kategoria Superiore players
Kategoria e Parë players
Football Superleague of Kosovo players
Expatriate footballers in Kosovo
Expatriate footballers in Germany
Albanian expatriate sportspeople in Kosovo
Albanian expatriate sportspeople in Germany